Sam Mayes (born 20 May 1994) is a former Australian rules footballer who played with the  and the Port Adelaide Football Club in the Australian Football League (AFL).

AFL career
Mayes made his AFL debut for Brisbane in the Round 3 match against Gold Coast in the 2013 AFL season. Mayes was nominated for the 2013 AFL Rising Star after his performance in round 12 against .

Mayes played his first game for Port Adelaide in Round 7 of the 2020 AFL season in a win against Carlton. Mayes was delisted at the conclusion of the 2022 AFL season.

Statistics
 Statistics are correct to end of 2018

|- style="background:#eaeaea;"
! scope="row" style="text-align:center" | 2013
| style="text-align:center" | 
| 32 || 18 || 12 || 5 || 198 || 103 || 301 || 87 || 45 || 0.7 || 0.3 || 11.0 || 5.7 || 16.7 || 4.8 || 2.5
|-
! scope="row" style="text-align:center" | 2014
| style="text-align:center" | 
| 32 || 21 || 11 || 11 || 192 || 159 || 351 || 92 || 47 || 0.5 || 0.5 || 9.1 || 7.6 || 16.7 || 4.4 || 2.2
|- style="background:#eaeaea;"
! scope="row" style="text-align:center" | 2015
| style="text-align:center" | 
| 32 || 14 || 2 || 5 || 108 || 94 || 202 || 68 || 28 || 0.1 || 0.4 || 7.7 || 6.7 || 14.4 || 4.9 || 2.0
|-
! scope="row" style="text-align:center" | 2016
| style="text-align:center" | 
| 32 || 21 || 1 || 1 || 239 || 132 || 371 || 88 || 45 || 0.0 || 0.0 || 11.4 || 6.3 || 17.7 || 4.2 || 2.1
|- style="background:#eaeaea;"
! scope="row" style="text-align:center" | 2017
| style="text-align:center" | 
| 32 || 21 || 0 || 1 || 270 || 170 || 440 || 127 || 38 || 0.0 || 0.0 || 12.9 || 8.1 || 21.0 || 6.0 || 1.8
|-
! scope="row" style="text-align:center" | 2018
| style="text-align:center" | 
| 32 || 6 || 0 || 1 || 51 || 46 || 97 || 24 || 9 || 0.0 || 0.2 || 8.5 || 7.7 || 16.2 || 4.0 || 1.5
|- class="sortbottom"
! colspan=3| Career
! 101
! 26
! 24
! 1058
! 704
! 1762
! 486
! 212
! 0.3
! 0.2
! 10.5
! 7.0
! 17.4
! 4.8
! 2.1
|}

References

External links

1994 births
Australian rules footballers from South Australia
Brisbane Lions players
North Adelaide Football Club players
Living people
People from Port Pirie
Port Adelaide Football Club players